Aar is a river of Hesse, Germany. It flows for  into the Dill near Herborn.

Tributaries
The tributaries of the Aar are as follows:
Brühlsbach (right) - 3.3 km 	
Stadterbach (left) - 6.6 km 
Wilsbach (right) - 6.3 km
Weidbach (right) - 5.9 km 	
Meerbach (right) - 5.2 km 	
Siegbach (right) - 12.2 km 	
Gellenbach  (left) - 4.2 km 	
Weibach (right) - 6.3 km
Gettenbach  (left) - 3.6 km	 	
Ballersbach  (left) - 3.2 km	
Essenbach (right) - 3.3 km 	
Dernbach  (left) - 2.7 km 	
Monzenbach (right) - 4.5 km

See also
List of rivers of Hesse

References

Rivers of Hesse
Rivers of Germany